This is a list of think tanks in the United Kingdom.

A–I

 Adam Smith Institute
 Africa Research Institute
 Bow Group
 Boyd Group
 Brand EU
 Bright Blue
 British American Security Information Council
 British Future
 Bruges Group
 Catalyst
 Centre for Cities
 The Centre for Cross Border Studies
 Centre for Defence and International Security Studies
 Centre for Economic and Social Inclusion
 Centre for Economic Policy Research
 Centre for European Reform
 Center for Global Development (Europe)
 Centre for Health and the Public Interest (CHPI)
 Centre for London
 Centre for Policy Studies
 Centre for Social Cohesion
 Centre for Social Justice
 Centre for Strategic Research and Analysis (CESRAN)
 Centre for the Analysis of Social Exclusion
 Centre for the Economics of Education
 Centre for Welfare Reform (CfWR)
 Chatham House
 City Mayors Foundation
 CIVITAS
 The Cobden Centre
 Common Weal
 Commonwealth Freedom of Movement Organisation
 Commonwealth Policy Studies Unit
 Compass
 The Constitution Society
 The Constitution Unit
 Cordoba Foundation
 Cornerstone Group
 Credos
 Defence Synergia
 Demos
 Development, Concepts and Doctrine Centre
 E3G
 Economists for Free Trade
 The Education Foundation
 Education Policy Institute
 Ekklesia
 Electoral Reform Society
 European Council on Foreign Relations
 European Foundation
 Fabian Society
 Foreign Policy Centre
 Future Economic Rural Network 
 Global Ideas Bank
 Global Vision
 Global Warming Policy Foundation
 Green Alliance
 Halsbury's Law Exchange
 Hansard Society
 Health Foundation
 The Henry Jackson Society
 Independent Transport Commission
 Initiative for Free Trade
 Innovation Unit
 Institute for Employment Studies
 Institute for Fiscal Studies
 Institute for Government
 Institute for Jewish Policy Research
 Institute for Public Policy Research
 Institute for Social Inventions
 Institute for Strategic Dialogue
 Institute of Advanced Study
 Institute of Development Studies (IDS)
 Institute of Economic Affairs
 Institute of Education
 Institute of Race Relations
 Institute of Welsh Affairs
 The Intergenerational Foundation
 International Growth Centre (IGC)
 International Institute for Environment and Development
 International Institute for Strategic Studies
 Involve

J–Z

 Jimmy Reid Foundation
 Joseph Rowntree Foundation
 Jubilee Centre
 King's Fund
 Legatum Institute
 Local Government Information Unit
 Localis
 LSE IDEAS
 Manchester Institute of Innovation Research
 MigrationWatch UK
 Million+
 Mutuo
 National Institute of Economic and Social Research
 Nesta
 New City Initiative
 New Economics Foundation
 New Local Government Network
 New Philanthropy Capital
 New Policy Institute
 New Politics Network
 Nuffield Council on Bioethics
 Nuffield Trust
 Official Monetary and Financial Institutions Forum
 One World Trust
 Onward (think tank)
 Open Europe
 Overseas Development Institute
 Oxford Research Group
 Philip Whitlam
 Polar Research and Policy Initiative
 Police Foundation
 Policy Connect
 Policy Exchange
 Policy Network
 Politeia
 Population Matters (formerly known as the Optimum Population Trust)
 Progress
 Public Policy Institute for Wales
 Quilliam
 RAND Europe (an independent division of the RAND Corporation)
 Reform
 Renewable Energy Foundation
 Resolution Foundation
 ResPublica
 Richardson Institute
 Royal Air Force Centre for Air Power Studies
 Royal Institute of International Affairs
 Royal Institute of Public Administration (1922–1992)
 Royal Society of Arts
 Royal United Services Institute for Defence and Security Studies
 Saunt Policy Studies Institute
 Science and Technology Policy Research (SPRU)
 Scotland's Futures Forum
 Scottish Constitutional Commission
 Scottish Global Forum
 Selsdon Group
 Smith Institute
 Social Affairs Unit
 Social Liberal Forum
 Social Market Foundation
 Society of Conservative Lawyers
 Sutton Trust
 TaxPayers' Alliance
 Theos
 UK in a Changing Europe
 United Nations Association - UK
 Unlock Democracy
 Von Hügel Institute
 WebRoots Democracy
 Young Fabians
 Young Foundation
 Wales Centre for Public Policy
 Wales Governance Centre
 Welsh Centre for International Affairs
 The Wilberforce Society
 Wales Institute of Social and Economic Research, Data and Methods
 The Work Foundation
 Z/Yen

See also 

 Advocacy group
 List of think tanks

External links 
 Thinktanks — Special Report, Politics, Guardian Unlimited

Think tanks
 
Think tanks
United Kingdom